Helianthus dissectifolius is a rare species of sunflower, endemic to Mexico. It is found only in the states of Chihuahua and Durango in north-central Mexico.

References

dissectifolius
Endemic flora of Mexico
Plants described in 1902